William Erbey is an American businessman and the founder of Ocwen Financial Corporation.  Erbey made billions during the subprime mortgage crisis by positioning Ocwen to take advantage of larger banks leaving the market; however, he later lost much of his wealth amid allegations of frequent legal violations and conflicts of interest by the company.  In 2014, these conflicts of interest led to Erbey's resignation from Ocwen's board as part of a settlement with the New York Department of Financial Services.

Ocwen Financial Corporation
Erbey was the founder of Ocwen Financial Corporation, a mortgage services company that made large amounts of money during the subprime mortgage crisis.  In 2014 he stepped down as board chairman as part of a settlement with the New York Department of Financial Services, and resigned from positions at several related companies, over what the New York regulator called "serious conflicts of interest."  Erbey chaired, and was the largest stakeholder for, four companies which had close business relationships with Ocwen; by directing default-related business to these companies, Erbey was able to profit by putting borrowers in default.  In order to do so, Ocwen used backdated letters to borrowers to make it appear as if they had not replied in the required timeframe and violated over a thousand of its other legal obligations. As part of his resignation, Erbey received a lump-sum payment of $1.2 million dollars from Ocwen.

Erbey has blamed what happened to his company on what he calls a "concerted smear campaign" by PIMCO and BlackRock, which he sued in 2017.

References

American chief operating officers
American investors
Living people
Harvard Business School alumni
Year of birth missing (living people)